Trichosea ludifica is a moth of the family Noctuidae. The species was first described by Carl Linnaeus in his 1758 10th edition of Systema Naturae. It is the type species of the genus Trichosea. It is found in the mountainous areas of central Europe, especially in western and northern Germany and the Bavarian Alps.

The wingspan is 42–50 mm. The moths are on wing from May to June and again from August to September depending on the location.

The larvae feed on Betula and Crataegus species, as well as Malus domestica and Sorbus aucuparia.

References

External links

"Trichosea ludifica (Linnaeus, 1758)". Fauna Europaea. Retrieved April 27, 2020.
"10370 Trichosea ludifica (Linnaeus, 1758) - Gelber Hermelin". Lepiforum e. V. Retrieved April 27, 2020. 
"Trichosea ludifica (Linnaeus, 1758)". Schmetterlinge-Deutschlands.de. Retrieved April 27, 2020. 

Pantheinae
Moths described in 1758
Moths of Japan
Moths of Europe
Taxa named by Carl Linnaeus